The 2018 Fall United Premier Soccer League season is the 11th season of the UPSL. Milwaukee Bavarian SC are the reigning champions. However, the Midwest Conference will not participate in the fall season, and the Bavarians will not be able to defend their title.

For the Fall 2018 season, UPSL had 89 teams compete in 13 Pro Premier Divisions divided into 5 conferences. An additional 29 teams competed in 3 Championships Divisions from 2 Conferences. The overall structure of the League by Conference and roughly from west to east is represented in the table below

 * Not participating

Pro Premier

Team changes
Joined Heart Division
Austin Real Cuauhtemoc — joined from Texas Premier Soccer League
FC Thunder Boerne — new senior team of youth club
Coyotes FC — new club
FC Knights — transferred from South Division
FC Waco — new club
Major Academy Competitive FC — new senior team of youth club
Round Rock SC — transferred from South Division
San Antonio Runners SC — new club

Joined North Division
Dallas City FC — joined from National Premier Soccer League during offseason
FC Denton — joined from North Texas Premier Soccer Association
Irving City FC
Terrell FC — joined from North Texas Premier Soccer Association

Left North Division
OKC 1889 FC — on hiatus
Texas Spurs

Joined South Division
Armadillos FC — new senior team of youth club
FC Imperial — new senior team of youth club
Houston FC — joined from Premier Development League during offseason

Left South Division
FC Knights — transferred to Heart Division
Round Rock SC — transferred to Heart Division

Joined Colorado Conference
Bright Stars of Colorado SC — promoted from Pro Premier

Left Colorado Conference
Colorado Springs FC
Denver Metro FC 
FC Boulder — expelled from league
FC Greeley — expelled from league
Northern Colorado FC 

Joined Mountain Conference
None

Left Mountain Conference
Idaho Lobos FC
Provo Premier
Magic Valley FC

Joined Florida Central Division
Huracan ECUSA FC
The Institute FC — new club

Left Florida Central Division
Clay County SC — on hiatus
Golden Goal Sports SC — on hiatus
Macca Ballers FC — on hiatus
St. Petersburg FC Aztecs — on hiatus

Joined Florida South Division
Gold Coast Inter AFC — joined from Beaches Adult Soccer League
International Soccer Association — new senior team of youth club
FSI Vultures FC — new club
Palm Beach Spartans — joined from American Premier Soccer League
Sharks FC — new senior team of youth club
UD Miami FC — joined from American Premier Soccer League

Left Florida South Division
Broncos United FC — on hiatus
Hialeah City FC — on hiatus
Miami Dade FC — on hiatus
Pinecrest SC — on hiatus

Joined Mid-Atlantic North Division
Catrachos De INCAEF — transferred from Northeast Conference American Division
Germantown City FC — joined from local amateur play
Northern Virginia FC — new club

Joined Mid-Atlantic South Division
San Lee FC — new senior team of youth club
Soda City FC — new club
Union FC — new senior team of youth club

Left Mid-Atlantic Division
Atlanta ASA FC
Bragg FC
Lowcountry United FC — on hiatus

Joined SoCal North Division
Cal FC — returned from hiatus; last played 2016 Spring season
FC Santa Clarita — formed from merger of Santa Clarita Storm and San Fernando Valley Scorpions
Kern County Mustangs FC — promoted from Championship
San Nicolas FC — promoted from Championship

Joined SoCal South Division
Cuervos FC — joined from California Champions League
Gremio FC San Diego — new club
OC Real Force SC — promoted from Championship and rebranded from CF Cachorros USA 
Orange County FC 2 — returned from hiatus; last played 2017 Fall season
San Diego Zest FC — returned from hiatus; last played 2017 Fall season

Left SoCal Division
La Máquina FC
L.A. Galaxy OC PSC
Ontario Fury II
San Fernando Valley Scorpions — merged with Santa Clarita Storm to form FC Santa Clarita
Santa Clarita Storm — merged with San Fernando Valley Scorpions to form FC Santa Clarita

Joined Wild West North Division
Azteca FC — returned from hiatus; last played 2017 Fall season
Vacaville Elite — joined from LIGA NorCal

Left Wild West Division
AFC San Francisco Hearts — on hiatus
California Victory FC — on hiatus
Southern Oregon Starphire FC — on hiatus
Redding Royals FC — on hiatus
Visalia Golden Bears 

Rebranded
Interunited Academy rebranded from Internacional USA
Oakland Stompers rebranded from East Bay FC Tecos Fire

Competition format
Teams are divided into five conferences, some of which are further subdivided into divisions. Unless specified otherwise, all playoff matches are contested over a single leg, hosted by the team with the best points-per-game ratio. Extra time is not used in any round; matches drawn after 90 minutes advance directly to a penalty shootout.

Central Conference: Teams are divided into Heart, North, and South divisions. Each division plays a double round robin for 14, 12, and 10 matches respectively. The top two teams from each division plus the two best third place teams by points-per-game qualify for the playoffs.
Colorado Conference: Teams play a double round robin in a single division for eight matches. The top four teams qualify for the playoffs.
Mountain Conference: Teams play a double round robin in a single division for four matches. The top two teams qualify for the playoffs.
Southeast Conference: Teams are divided into Mid-Atlantic, Florida Central, and Florida South divisions. Each division determines its own champion. The champions of the Florida divisions then play, with the winner facing the champion of the Mid-Atlantic division to determine the conference champion.
Florida Central Division: Teams play a double round robin for 14 matches. The top seven teams qualify for the playoffs with the division leader receiving a bye to the divisional semifinals.
Florida South Division: Teams play a single round robin for 13 matches. The top eight teams qualify for the playoffs.
Mid-Atlantic Division: Teams are further divided into north and south sections. Each section plays a double round robin for eight and ten matches respectively. The top eight teams by points-per-game across both sections qualify for the playoffs.
Western Conference: Teams are divided into SoCal and Wild West divisions. Each division determines its own champion with the two divisional champions then matched up to determine the conference champion.
SoCal Division: Teams are further divided into north and south sections. Each section plays a single round robin for eight matches. The top three teams in each section qualify for the playoffs, with the section leaders receiving byes to the divisional semifinals. The last placed team in each section is relegated to the Championship.
Wild West Division: Teams are further divided into north and south sections. Each section plays a double round robin for eight matches. The top two teams in each division qualify for the playoffs, with the top seed in each section hosting the second seed in the other section.
National Playoffs: The champions of the Colorado and Mountain conferences play. The winner of that match then plays the champion of the Western conference while the champions of the Central and Southeast conferences play. The two winners then contest the national championship.

Standings

Heart Division

North Division

South Division

Colorado Conference

Mountain Conference

Florida Central Division

Florida South Division

Mid-Atlantic Division North

Mid-Atlantic Division South

SoCal Division North

SoCal Division South

Wild West Division North

Wild West Division South

Playoffs

Central Conference playoffs

Colorado Conference playoffs

Mountain Conference playoffs

The match originally ended 5-1 in favor of San Juan FC, but they were subsequently ruled to have fielded an ineligible player. Boise Cutthroats FC was advanced to the next round.

Florida Central Division playoffs

Florida South Division playoffs

Mid-Atlantic Division playoffs

SoCal Division playoffs

Wild West Division playoffs

National playoffs

Championship

Southeast Conference

Florida Central Division
The following 7 clubs joined the division for its inaugural season
CD Miguelense
Independiente FC
Instituto Atletico FC II
Millos United FC
Nationwide FC 
The A Team
Valencia College FC

Standings

Western Conference

SoCal Division

SoCal North Division
The following 4 northern SoCal Championship clubs left the division before the season
Kern County Mustangs FC — promoted to Pro Premier
San Nicolas FC — promoted to Pro Premier
USA/MEX SoCal
USA Soccer Stars FC

The following 5 clubs joined the division before the season
CD Independiente
San Fernando Valley FC — returned from hiatus; last played 2017 Fall season
Sporting San Fernando II — new reserve team of Pro Premier club
Warriors FC — new club
Xolos Academy L.A.

The following club rebranded before the season
LA 10 FC — rebranded from L.A. Roma FC

Standings

SoCal South Division
The following 3 southern SoCal Championship clubs left the division before the season
CF Cachorros USA — promoted to Pro Premier
L.A. Galaxy OC PSC II
La Habra City FC

The following 2 clubs joined the division before the season
California Rush SC — new senior team of youth club
City Legends FC — new club

The following club rebranded before the season
Santa Ana Winds FC II — rebranded from MX Dream SC

Standings

Playoffs

References

United Premier Soccer League seasons
2018 in American soccer leagues